Senikavika Kelemete Leawere (born 27 April 1974) is a Fijian rugby union player. He plays as a lock.

Career
He is the elder brother of former Fiji sevens rep, Mika Leawere and Sekove Leawere. He departed for New Zealand in 1996 and has made an excellent name for himself in NPC Division Two with East Coast, making 56 appearances and playing for the NZ Divisional XV against Italy and Ireland. He also played for the Fiji Warriors against the ACT Brumbies in 1997. He played for Nadroga and also represented the Coastal Stallions in the Colonial Cup.

In October 2002, Leawere flew to Fiji to attend the national trials and won selection for the tour to Britain and Ireland, making his Test debut as a replacement against Scotland. He scored his first test try in June 2004 when he twisted and turned his way through the Samoan defense in Suva. He was a member of the Fiji team at the 2003 Rugby World Cup.

In May 2007, he was chosen to be part of Fiji team for the 2007 Pacific Nations Cup and later on co-captained the Fiji team at the 2007 Rugby World Cup. In the 2007 World Cup he scored one of the tries as Fiji defeated Wales to reach their first quarter final in 20 years. 

In August 2014, he joined the National Federation Party to contest in the upcoming elections.

References

External links
 Fiji profile
 Scrum profile

1974 births
Living people
Fijian rugby union players
Rugby union locks
Fiji international rugby union players
Fijian expatriate rugby union players
Expatriate rugby union players in New Zealand
Fijian expatriate sportspeople in New Zealand
East Coast rugby union players
Poverty Bay rugby union players
National Federation Party politicians
Pacific Islanders rugby union players
Politicians from Levuka